Erta Ale (or Ertale or Irta'ale; Amharic: ኤርታሌ) is a continuously active basaltic shield volcano in the Afar Region of northeastern Ethiopia. It is situated in the Afar Depression, a barren desert area. Erta Ale is the most active volcano in Ethiopia.

Geology
It is notable for holding the longest-existing lava lake, present since the early years of the twentieth century (1906). Volcanoes with lava lakes are very rare: there are only eight in the world.

Erta Ale means "smoking mountain" in the local Afar language and its southernmost pit is known locally as "the gateway to Hell". In 2009, it was mapped by a team from the BBC using three-dimensional laser techniques, in order for the mapping team to maintain a distance and avoid the lakes' searingly hot temperatures.

Erta Ale is centered over the East African Rift system, which is a triple junction setting whose movements are resulting in the formation of a pull-apart basin or rift. The volcano comprises mainly mafic material which has been brought up to the surface caused by unroofing of the mantle due to this rift formation.

There was a major eruption on 25 September 2005 which killed 250 head of livestock and forced thousands of nearby residents to flee. There was further lava flow in August 2007, forcing the evacuation of hundreds and leaving two missing. An eruption on 4 November 2008 was reported by scientists at Addis Ababa University. Another eruption was reported in January 2017.

Tourism

Erta Ale is the most regularly visited volcano in the Danakil Alps. However, not much is known about the volcano, and the surrounding terrain is some of the most inhospitable on Earth, making travel difficult and dangerous. The Afar region also experiences intermittent ethnic violence due to unification struggles by the native Afar people. On January 17, 2012, a group of European tourists was attacked at Erta Ale. Five tourists were killed, two taken as hostages and seven others wounded. The Afar Revolutionary Democratic Unity Front (ARDUF) claimed responsibility for the attack and released the two kidnapped tourists in March 2012. One travel guide recommends hiring "one or maybe two armed guards or police" as guides to visit Erta Ale. Commercial tour companies offer tours to Erta Ale which are generally accompanied by military escort.

In December 2017, a German tourist was fatally shot while descending Erta Ale.

In popular culture
The lava lake on Erta Ale was shown briefly during the 2010 movie Clash of the Titans during the journey sequence where Perseus travels to the underworld.  Erta Ale is featured in the 2016 Werner Herzog documentary, Into the Inferno.

See also
 Erta Ale Range
 Geography of Ethiopia
 List of volcanoes in Ethiopia

References

External links

Photos from an expedition in Nov and Dec 2009
 Photos from an expedition to Erta Ale and the Danakil in Feb. 2008
  Photos of Erta Ale: Expedition Nov 2006
 BBC article about Erta Ale
 Photographs of Erta Ale, February 2015

Active volcanoes
Volcanoes of the Great Rift Valley
Shield volcanoes of Ethiopia
Afar Region
Calderas of Ethiopia
Polygenetic shield volcanoes
Mountains of Ethiopia
VEI-2 volcanoes
Lava lakes